The FIAT 634N ( [diesel]) is the military variant of the civilian FIAT 632 heavy truck manufactured by Italian manufacturer FIAT from 1931 to 1939.

It was used by the Regio Esercito units to transport troops or supplies.

Specification
The 634N was initially launched with the Fiat 355 engine, a 6-cylinder 8.3-litre (8312 cc) diesel engine producing . In 1933, the engine was upgraded to the Fiat 355C unit, a slightly larger 8.4-litre (8355 cc) engine producing .

Height: 
Length: 
Width: 
Maximum Speed: 
Maximum Payload:

References

634
Military trucks of Italy
Military vehicles introduced in the 1930s
Military vehicles of the interwar period
World War II vehicles of Italy
Vehicles introduced in 1931